Kadena may refer to:
 Kadena, Okinawa, a town in Japan
 Kadena Air Base

People with the surname
 Reon Kadena, Japanese model and actress

See also
Kadeena Cox, British parasport athlete
Kadina (disambiguation)